Farrend James Rawson (born 11 July 1996) is an English professional footballer who plays as a central defender for League One club Morecambe.

Career
Rawson was born in Nottingham and began his footballing career at Derby County. On 3 June 2014 it was reported that Rawson had been offered a professional contract at Derby and would join the club's Under-21 team for the 2014–15 season.

He was called up to the Derby first-team squad and was an unused substitute as Derby won 1–0 at Pride Park against Charlton Athletic in the second round of the League Cup on 26 August 2014.

Rawson signed on a 28-day youth loan for fellow Championship club Rotherham United on 7 March 2015, making his debut the same day in a 2–0 away win against Huddersfield Town. His loan spell at Rotherham expired on 4 April but he played against Brighton & Hove Albion two days later and subsequently Rotherham faced a charge for fielding an ineligible player. On 24 April, Rotherham were deducted three points and fined £30,000 for fielding him in that match.

Rawson re-joined Rotherham on a six-month loan deal on 15 July 2015, along with teammate Kelle Roos. Upon re-signing Rawson, then boss Steve Evans described Rawson as being a future Premier League player and was complimentary about the players performances on loan the previous season calling them "outstanding". Rawson scored his first senior goal in a 1–1 draw against Charlton on 12 September 2015. On 7 January 2016, Rawson's loan at Rotherham was extended until the end of the season, however on 22 February 2016, a clause was activated allowing his immediate recall by Derby.

On 17 January 2017, Rawson joined League One club Coventry City on loan until the end of the season. Rawson was cup-tied for Coventry's win in the 2017 EFL Trophy Final. On 31 August 2017, he moved on loan to Accrington Stanley until January 2018. On 4 January 2018, he signed for Forest Green Rovers on an 18-month contract.

Rawson joined Mansfield Town on 18 July 2020.

On 18 June 2022, Rawson agreed to join League One club Morecambe upon the expiration of his Mansfield Town contract.

Career statistics

References

External links

1996 births
Living people
Footballers from Nottingham
English footballers
Association football defenders
Derby County F.C. players
Rotherham United F.C. players
Coventry City F.C. players
Forest Green Rovers F.C. players
Accrington Stanley F.C. players
Mansfield Town F.C. players
Morecambe F.C. players
English Football League players